Lunbei Township is a rural township in Yunlin County, Taiwan.

Geography
It has a population total of 23,051 people and 1 sage, and an area of 58.4840 square kilometers.(as of February 2023)

Administrative divisions
Tungming, Xirong, Nanyang, Lunqian, Luocuo, Gangwei, Aquan, Wukui, Dayou, Fengrong, Caohu, Jiuzhuang, Shuiwei and Fangnan Village.

Economy
The township grows watermelon and cantaloupe all year round. In 2002, the township had 58 dairy farms raising about 10,000 cows with several tones of annual milk production. The total annual dairy product production is around NT$500 to NT$600 million. The township also produces chicken from its farms.

Tourist attractions
 Zhaoan Hakka Cultural Hall

Notable natives
 Hsu Shu-ching, weightlifter

References

External links

 Lunbei Township Office, Yunlin County

Townships in Yunlin County